Jules Bertaut (28 March 1877 – 7 October 1959) was a French writer, historian and lecturer.

He was awarded the grand prix de littérature de la SGDL in 1959 for all his work, the year he died.

Works 
Selected works:

1900: Secrets d'un siècle, Amiot
1904: Marcel Prévost, 
1906: Figures contemporaines : chroniqueurs et polémistes..., E. Sansot
1908: Balzac anecdotique, Sansot, 1908
1909: La littérature féminine d'aujourd'hui, Librairie des annules
1912: Victor Hugo, Voltaire, Louis Michaud
1910: La jeune fille dans la littérature française, L. Michaud
1913: L'Italie vue par les français, Prix Montyon of the Académie française
1918: Ce qu'était la province française avant la guerre..., La Renaissance du livre
1919: Le Paris d'avant-guerre, La Renaissance du livre
1919: Louis Barthou, E. Sansot
1920: Le Roman nouveau, Renaissance du Livre
1921: Une amitié romantique : George Sand et François Rollinat, Renaissance du livre
1924: Le Boulevard, Flammarion
1924: Henry Bordeaux, son œuvre Éditions de la Nouvelle revue critique
1927: Villégiatures romantiques, Le Goupy
1927: Les belles nuits de Paris, E. Flammarion
1928: Égéries du XVIIIe : madame Suard, madame Delille, madame Helvétius, madame Diderot, mademoiselle Quinault, Plon
1928: Le père Goriot de Balzac, E. Malfère
1930: Le Théâtre-Libre et son influence sur le théâtre français contemporain, Institut français en Portugal
1931: L'opinion et les mœurs. La Troisième République de 1870 à nos jours, Les Éditions de France
1933: La Bourse anecdotique et pittoresque, Les Éditions de France
1936: Paris, 1870-1935, Eyre and Spottiswoode
1936: Le roi bourgeois (Louis-Philippe intime), Éditions Grasset
1937: 1848 et la seconde république, A. Fayard
1939: Napoléon III secret, B. Grasset
1941: Madame de Genlis, B. Grasset
1943: La vie à Paris sous le Premier Empire, Éditions Balzac
1943: Le retour à la monarchie, 1815-1848, Fayard
1945: Talleyrand, H. Lardanchet
1946: Madame Tallien, Fayard
1947: Madame Récamier, Grasset
1947: Visages romantiques, J. Ferenczi
1948: Les belles émigrés, Flammarion
1949: Napoléon I aux Tuileries, Hachette
1949: Le faubourg Saint-Germain sous l'Empire et la Restauration, 
1949: La Duchesse d'Abrantès, Flammarion
1950: La vie privée de Balzac, Hachette
1951: Paris à travers les âges, Hachette
1951: Napoléon ignoré, SFELT
1952: La vie privée de Chateaubriand, Hachette
1952: Les parisiens sous la révolution, Club international du livre
1953: Côte d'Azur, Hachette
1954: Le roi Jérôme, Flammarion
1954: Les dessous de la finance, Tallandier
1954: La vie littéraire en France au XVIIIe siècle, Tallandier
1955: Amoureuses et femmes galantes, Les Éditions de Lyon
1956: L'Impératrice Eugénie et son temps, Bibliothèque Amiot-Dumont
1957: Secrets d'un siècle, P. Amiot
1959: Les dessous de la troisième (république), Tallandier
1959: La reine Hortense, Bloud & Gay

 References 

 External links 
 Jules Bertaut on Babelio
 Jules Bertaut on Media 19
 Le boulevard, de Jules Bertaut in Le Monde diplomatique'' (August 1957)
 Jules Bertaut on the site of the Académie française

20th-century French historians
20th-century French writers
20th-century French male writers
French biographers
Winners of the Prix Broquette-Gonin (literature)
Writers from Bourges
1877 births
1959 deaths
French male non-fiction writers